William Anthony Blalock (born September 8, 1983 in Boston) is a former American professional basketball player, who last played for the Saint John Mill Rats of the National Basketball League of Canada.

Early years
Blalock played basketball at East Boston High School, but later graduated from Notre Dame Preparatory School in 2003. He then attended Iowa State University and played for the Cyclones from 2003 to 2006, making one NCAA Tournament appearance in 2005, playing under coach Wayne Morgan. Blalock declared for the NBA Draft after his junior year.

Professional career
Blalock was selected by the Detroit Pistons in the second round with the last pick (60th overall) in the 2006 NBA Draft. In the 2006-07 season, he averaged 11.9 minutes, 1.8 points, 1.1 rebounds, and 1.2 assists per game, under coach Flip Saunders. Blalock played a total of fourteen games during that season, which marked his only season in the league. His final NBA game was a 96-75 win over the Philadelphia 76ers, where he played just over six minutes, and recorded 2 points and 2 rebounds.

Blalock continued to play professional basketball outside of the NBA over the course of his career. In 2007, he was assigned by the Pistons to play for the Sioux Falls Skyforce in the NBA G League. That same year, he also transferred overseas to play for Hapoel Jerusalem of the Israeli Basketball Premier League, but soon returned to the G League, instead with the Anaheim Arsenal.

In 2008, Blalock once again went overseas. This time, he signed for the Artland Dragons of the Basketball Bundesliga in Germany. In the following season, the G League called again as he joined the Maine Red Claws from 2009 to 2010, and then the Reno Bighorns in the latter part of the season.

In the 2010-11 season, Blalock signed for the Townsville Crocodiles of the National Basketball League in Australia, and then for the Saint John Mill Rats of the National Basketball League of Canada. In the following season, he once again returned to the Reno Bighorns, but soon moved on to the Huracanes del Atlántico of the Liga Nacional de Baloncesto in the Dominican Republic.

In Blalock's final professional season in 2012-13, he rejoined his former teams, the Bighorns and the Mill Rats.

References

External links
Eurobasket profile
NBA D-League profile

1983 births
Living people
American expatriate basketball people in Australia
American expatriate basketball people in Canada
American expatriate basketball people in Germany
American expatriate basketball people in Israel
Anaheim Arsenal players
Artland Dragons players
Basketball players from Boston
Detroit Pistons draft picks
Detroit Pistons players
Hapoel Jerusalem B.C. players
Iowa State Cyclones men's basketball players
Maine Red Claws players
Point guards
Reno Bighorns players
Saint John Mill Rats players
Sioux Falls Skyforce players
Townsville Crocodiles players
American men's basketball players
Huracanes del Atlántico players